Forbidden Waters is a 1926 American silent comedy film directed by Alan Hale and starring Priscilla Dean, Walter McGrail and Dan Mason.

Cast
 Priscilla Dean as Nancy 
 Walter McGrail as J. Austin Bell 
 Dan Mason as Nugget Pete 
 Casson Ferguson as Sylvester 
 De Sacia Mooers as Ruby

References

Bibliography
 Munden, Kenneth White. The American Film Institute Catalog of Motion Pictures Produced in the United States, Part 1. University of California Press, 1997.

External links

1926 films
Silent American comedy films
Films directed by Alan Hale
American silent feature films
1920s English-language films
Producers Distributing Corporation films
American black-and-white films
1926 comedy films
1920s American films